Ladislav Patras (born 19 July 1967) was a Czechoslovakian nordic combined skier who competed in the late 1980s. He finished sixth in the 3 × 10 km team event at the 1988 Winter Olympics in Calgary.

References

External links
3 × 10 km Olympic results: 1988–2002 

Nordic combined skiers at the 1988 Winter Olympics
Czech male Nordic combined skiers
Living people
1967 births
Olympic Nordic combined skiers of Czechoslovakia
Sportspeople from Banská Bystrica